Tropomyosin alpha-3 chain is a protein that in humans is encoded by the TPM3 gene.

This gene encodes a member of the tropomyosin family of actin-binding proteins involved in the contractile system of striated and smooth muscles and the cytoskeleton of non-muscle cells. Tropomyosins are dimers of coiled-coil proteins that polymerize end-to-end along the major groove in most actin filaments. They provide stability to the filaments and regulate access of other actin-binding proteins. In muscle cells, they regulate muscle contraction by controlling the binding of myosin heads to the actin filament. Mutations in this gene result in autosomal dominant nemaline myopathy, and oncogenes formed by chromosomal translocations involving this locus are associated with cancer. Multiple transcript variants encoding different isoforms have been found for this gene.

References

Further reading

External links
  GeneReviews/NCBI/NIH/UW entry on Nemaline Myopathy